Joseph Moutschen (18 March 1895 at Jupille, Belgium – 22 December 1977 at Jupille), was a Modernist Belgian architect.

Biography 
Moutschen entered the Liège Académie des Beaux-Arts at the age of nine. He received his diploma in 1917 and entered the Association des Architectes de Liège in 1923. He became a professor, then director of the Académie de Beaux-Arts de Liège from 1948 to 1960. Moutschen designed a number of projects around Liège characterized by a pragmatic approach and an extreme sobriety of style. He is most remembered for the Albert I Memorial on the Albert Canal at Liège, built in the form of a lighthouse.

Moutschen was a founding member of the International Union of Architects and a member of its executive committee in 1948. He was president of the Belgian Fédération Royale des Architects until 1959.

Projects 
 The Pont-barrage de Monsin at Liège, 1930 
 Institute of Civil Engineering at Val-Benoît, 1937, on the quai Banning at Liège, in the Bauhaus style of Walter Gropius.
 Jules Seeliger Surgical Institute, rue Jonfosse at Liège (1936–1939)
 "Aérogare 58"  at the Brussels Airport, Zaventem, in collaboration with Georges Bontinck de Gand and Maxime Brunfaut, 1958
 Albert I Memorial, monument at the entry to the Albert Canal at Liège, esplanadeand park inaugurated 30 July 1939. Sculptors were Louis Dupont. The  tower is topped by a lighthouse, with a sculpture of Belgian King Albert I.
 Institute of Civil Engineering, on the quai Banning along the Meuse

Other buildings 

 Wandre school
 Jupille scholl
 Romsée school, 1959
 The majority of the pumping stations for the Association Intercommunale pour le Démergement et l'Épuration of Liège
 L'hôtel de Ville de Jemeppe avec B. Sélerin et J. Mullenaerts.
 La Salle Prevert, Jupille
 Fontaine Charlemagne, sculptor; Oscar Berchmans.
 Garden city of Tribouilet, 1922. Executed for the International Exposition of 1930, a collection of inexpensive houses in a variety of styles by architects including Moutschen, Louis Herman de Koninck, Victor Bourgeois and Fernand Bodson.
 Cité des Cortils (1925–1935)
 "Gallo-Roman" town, Jupille
 "Héros of Rabosée" Monument at Wandre, A. Fivet, statuary, F. Close, sculptor
 House of the architect, 40 Rue Jean-Jaures Jupille, 1932
 Monument to the Belgian Repression of Grâce-Berleur, 1952
 Mi-la-Ville footbridge at Jupille

Publications 
 Souvenirs sur Frank Lloyd Wright, Cité et Tekhne 10 November 1931
 BATIR, 15 July 1935, Issue dedicated to Joseph Moutschen, Paris 1935
 Université de Liège, Institute of Civil Engineering

Family 
His brother Jean Moutschen (1900–1951), was also an architect. His brother Michel Moutschen (1923–1947) was a war correspondent for the Associated Press, killed by a sniper in Vietnam. His son Jean Moutschen-Dahmen (1929–2001) was Professor Emeritus of fundamental genetics at the University of Liège.

References

External links 
 Photographs of Moutschen works at Mémoire Photographique de Liège

Belgian architects
1895 births
1977 deaths
Modernist architects